The Jupiter Inlet Historic and Archeological Site is an archaeological site in Jupiter, Florida. It is located off A1A in the area of DuBois Park. An ancient shell midden built by the Jaega people, it was the site of the village of Hobe (or Jobe in Spanish orthography), which was later conflated with Jove and inspired the name of the town of Jupiter, Florida, where it is located. On November 5, 1985, it was added to the U.S. National Register of Historic Places.

References

External links

 Palm Beach County listings at National Register of Historic Places
 Palm Beach County listings at Florida's Office of Cultural and Historical Programs

Native American history of Florida
Archaeological sites in Florida
National Register of Historic Places in Palm Beach County, Florida